Punghina is a commune located in Mehedinți County, Oltenia, Romania. It is composed of five villages: Cearângu, Drincea, Măgurele, Punghina, Recea.

References

Communes in Mehedinți County
Localities in Oltenia